Thermosinus is a Gram-negative bacteria genus from the family of Acidaminococcaceae. Up to now there is only one species of this genus known (Thermosinus carboxydivorans).

References

Further reading 
 
 
 

Eubacteriales
Monotypic bacteria genera
Bacteria genera